The women's 3000 meter at the 2011 KNSB Dutch Single Distance Championships took place in Heerenveen at the Thialf ice skating rink on Saturday 6 November 2010. Although this tournament was held in 2010, it was part of the 2010–2011 speed skating season .

There were 20 participants.

Title holder was Ireen Wüst.

The first 5 skaters qualified for the following 2010–11 ISU Speed Skating World Cup tournaments.

Overview

Result

Draw

Source:

References

Single Distance Championships
2011 Single Distance
World